Isaac Martin may refer to:

Isaac George Martin (1889–1962)
Isaac Jack Martin (1908–1966), judge of the United States Court of Customs and Patent Appeals
Isaac Martin (died 1793), participant in the mutiny on the Bounty
Ike Martin (1887–?), footballer